Dobrin Ramon Gașpar (born 2 February 2003) is a Romanian footballer who plays as a midfielder for FC Argeș Pitești.

Career
In 2021, Gașpar signed for Romanian top flight side Gaz Metan Mediaș from the youth academy of Cork City in the Republic of Ireland. On 25 July 2021, he debuted for Gaz Metan Mediaș during a 0-2 loss to Farul Constanța.

References

External links
 
 

Romanian footballers
Living people
Romania youth international footballers
Liga I players
Association football midfielders
CS Gaz Metan Mediaș players
FC Argeș Pitești players
People from Mediaș
Expatriate association footballers in the Republic of Ireland
Romanian expatriate footballers
2003 births